Muhammad Ayyub ibn Muhammad Yusuf ibn Sulaiman `Umar was a Saudi Arabian Imam, Qari, and Islamic scholar known for his recitation of the Quran. He was an Imam of Al-Masjid an-Nabawi in Medina, Saudi Arabia. He was also a faculty member of the Department of Tafsir in the Faculty of the Holy Qur'an and Islamic Studies at the Islamic University of Madinah and a member of the Scholarly Committee of the King Fahd Complex for the Printing of the Holy Quran. His death occurred on 16 April 2016.

Biography
Muhammad Ayyub was born in either 1952 or 1953 (1372 AH) in Mecca, Saudi Arabia, and died on April 16, 2016 in Madina, Saudi Arabia.

His father was a poor man whose family had migrated from their native land of Burma to Makkah to flee from the oppression that was carried out against the Muslims of Burma. He had a very harsh childhood with his elder brother working for the family, when his father was imprisoned in Burma.

He completed memorizing the Quran in 1385 AH (1965/1966) under Khalil ibn `Abd ar-Rahman al-Qari' in Mecca. After completing his primary education in 1386 AH (1966/1967), he moved to Medina, where he completed his intermediate and secondary education at an Islamic school, graduating in 1392 AH (1972).

He then enrolled in the Faculty of Sharia at the Islamic University of Madinah, receiving a bachelor's degree in 1396 AH (1976). Then he specialized in Tafsir and `Ulum al-Qur'an (Quranic exegesis and sciences of the Quran), receiving a master's degree from the Faculty of the Holy Qur'an and Islamic Studies. He received a doctorate from the same faculty in 1408 AH (1987/1988).

Besides studying at school, he also studied under several other Islamic scholars in Medina, in subjects including tafsir and its related sciences, the fiqh of the four madh'habs, hadith and hadith terminology, and usul al-fiqh.

In 1410 AH (1990) he was appointed as an imam of Al-Masjid an-Nabawi. He held this post until 1417 AH (1997). Later he spent few years as an Imam in Masjid Quba and other mosques. He was appointed back as an Imam of Al-Masjid an-Nabawi in 2015 (1436 hijri) to read taraweeh prayer.

Muhammad Ayyub was of Burmese descent and followed the Hanbali madh'hab.

Death
He died on 16 April 2016 and was buried in Baqi Cemetery in Medina.

References

1950s births
2016 deaths
Saudi Arabian imams
Saudi Arabian people of Burmese descent
Saudi Arabian Quran reciters
Burials at Jannat al-Baqī